John Stewart, 3rd Earl of Lennox (4 September 1526, Linlithgow, West Lothian) was a prominent Scottish magnate.  He was the son of Matthew Stewart, 2nd Earl of Lennox and Lady Elizabeth Hamilton, daughter of James Hamilton, 1st Lord Hamilton and Mary Stewart, Princess of Scotland, daughter of King James II of Scotland.

The Earl of Lennox led an army to Linlithgow with the intention of liberating the young King James V of Scotland from the pro-English Douglases. He was defeated by a smaller force led by James Hamilton, 1st Earl of Arran, at the Battle of Linlithgow Bridge. He survived the battle and was taken captive, only to be subsequently murdered by James Hamilton of Finnart. Lennox was succeeded by his son, Matthew Stewart, the father of Henry Stewart, Lord Darnley, and the grandfather of King James VI of Scotland.

Family and issue
On 19 January 1511, he married Lady Elizabeth Stewart, daughter of John Stewart, 1st Earl of Atholl and Lady Eleanor Sinclair, daughter of William Sinclair, 3rd Earl of Orkney. They had issue:

 Matthew Stewart, 4th Earl of Lennox
 Robert Stewart, 1st Earl of Lennox and March (1522–1586)
 John Stewart, 6th Lord of Aubigny (died c.1567), father of Esme Stewart, 1st Duke of Lennox
 Lady Helen (or Eleanor) Stewart, who married: firstly to William Hay, 6th Earl of Erroll; secondly to John Gordon, 11th Earl of Sutherland.
 Lady Elizabeth Stewart, who married Ninian Ross. She was the mistress of King James V, and the mother of Adam Stewart, Prior of Perth Charterhouse.

Ancestors

Sources 
G. E. Cokayne et al., eds. The Complete Peerage of England, Scotland, Ireland, Great Britain, and the United Kingdom, Extant, Extinct, or Dormant. Reprint ed. (Gloucester, UK: Alan Sutton Publishing, 2000).

Richard D Oram in his article on John Stewart 3rd Earl of Lennox in the new Ox. DNB writes that he married Elizabeth Stewart, daughter of John Stewart, 1st Earl of Atholl on 19 January 1511.

Stewart, John, 3rd Earl
John
1526 deaths
Year of birth uncertain
16th-century Scottish peers